Sibani Mandal Mahavidyalaya, also known as Namkhana College, established in 2013, is an undergraduate college in Namkhana, West Bengal, India. This college is affiliated to the University of Calcutta.

Departments

Arts
Bengali
English
Sanskrit
History
Geography
Political Science
Philosophy
Education

Accreditation
Sibani Mandal Mahavidyalaya is recognized by the University Grants Commission (UGC).

See also 
List of colleges affiliated to the University of Calcutta
Education in India
Education in West Bengal

References

External links
Mandal Mahavidyalaya

Educational institutions established in 2013
University of Calcutta affiliates
Universities and colleges in South 24 Parganas district
2013 establishments in West Bengal